Stig "Vittjärv" Sundqvist (19 July 1922 – 3 August 2011) was a Swedish professional footballer who played as a forward or midfielder.

Career 
Sundqvist played 11 games for the Swedish national team and scored 3 goals at the 1950 FIFA World Cup, helping Sweden to a third-place finish and their first ever World Cup medal. After the World Cup he left Swedish side IFK Norrköping for the Italian club A.S. Roma, where he remained until 1953. Upon returning to Sweden he was active in coaching, among other teams Jönköpings Södra IF, for several years.

Personal life 
During his active days he was known by the nickname "Vittjärv", after the Swedish village where he grew up.

Career statistics

International 

 Scores and results list Sweden's goal tally first, score column indicates score after each Sundqvist goal.

Honours 
Sweden
 FIFA World Cup third place: 1950

References

External links
 FIFA Player Statistics: Stig SUNDQVIST

1922 births
2011 deaths
Swedish footballers
Sweden international footballers
Swedish expatriate footballers
Expatriate footballers in Italy
Allsvenskan players
Serie A players
Serie B players
A.S. Roma players
IFK Norrköping players
GIF Sundsvall players
1950 FIFA World Cup players
People from Boden Municipality
Swedish football managers
GIF Sundsvall managers
Association football midfielders
Association football forwards
Sportspeople from Norrbotten County